Little by Little is an album by Australian guitarist Tommy Emmanuel that was released in 2010.

Emmanuel released interactive video lessons of 16 songs from the album.

Reception

William Ruhlmann from AllMusic said "Emmanuel is simply a guitar player, and on Little by Little, he sticks mostly to acoustic guitar, playing mostly original tunes that he has used in concert but not recorded before. He is also mostly solo, although the double-disc length allows him room to share space with guests including singers Pam Rose and Anthony Snape. Among the covers are two versions of "Moon River" one with a bass countermelody, the other with an Emmanuel vocal." adding "He also likes folk-pop; "Papa George" needs only a James Taylor vocal to fit into that category but Little by Little is a tour de force by a musician who usually leaves categories behind."

Jason Shadrick from Premier Guitar said "From the opening notes of "Halfway Home" Tommy Emmanuel bowls you over with his amazing technique and his ability to craft a melody that sticks in your head. Little by Little is an ambitious double album full of everything from delicate Beatles-inspired fingerpicking to the barn-burning instrumentals that have become a cornerstone of his live shows." adding "With so many moving parts on this album, from different guests to genres, Emmanuel has created one of the most accessible albums of his career, one that’s sure to inspire other guitarists to drop the pick more often."

Track listing

Release history

References

2010 albums
Sony Music Australia albums
Tommy Emmanuel albums